Silvia Valsecchi (born 19 July 1982) is an Italian former racing cyclist, who rode professionally between 2002 and 2021 for the Itera Team,  and . She competed in the 2013 UCI women's team time trial in Florence.

Major results

Road

2004
 8th Chrono Champenois
2005
 3rd Time trial, National Road Championships
 4th Chrono Champenois
2006
 1st  Time trial, National Road Championships
 3rd Overall Tour Féminin en Limousin
2007
 3rd Time trial, National Road Championships
 9th Overall Tour Féminin en Limousin
2008
 3rd Time trial, National Road Championships
2009
 3rd Time trial, National Road Championships
 8th Memorial Davide Fardelli
2010
 2nd Time trial, National Road Championships
 10th Memorial Davide Fardelli
2011
 National Road Championships
2nd Time trial
3rd Road race
2012
 1st Stage 6 Vuelta a El Salvador
 2nd Road race, National Road Championships
2013
 1st Grand Prix el Salvador
 1st Stage 2 (TTT) Vuelta a El Salvador
 3rd Time trial, National Road Championships
2014
 3rd  Team time trial, UCI Road World Championships
2015
 1st  Time trial, National Road Championships
 4th Overall Tour de Bretagne Féminin
 8th Ljubljana–Domžale–Ljubljana TT
2016
 3rd Time trial, National Road Championships
 4th Overall Tour de Bretagne Féminin
1st Stage 2 (ITT)
2017
 1st Stage 1 (TTT) Setmana Ciclista Valenciana
 1st Stage 4 Tour Cycliste Féminin International de l'Ardèche
 3rd Time trial, National Road Championships
2018
 6th VR Women ITT
 8th Horizon Park Women Challenge
 8th Ljubljana–Domžale–Ljubljana TT
2019
 3rd  Mixed team relay, UEC European Road Championships

Track

2013
 Copa Internacional de Pista
2nd Points race
3rd Individual pursuit
2014
 1st Individual pursuit, International Belgian Open
 3rd  Team pursuit, UEC European Track Championships
2016
 1st  Team pursuit, UEC European Track Championships
2017
 UEC European Track Championships
1st  Team pursuit
3rd  Individual pursuit
 Team pursuit, 2017–18 UCI Track Cycling World Cup
1st  Pruszków
2nd  Manchester
2nd  Santiago
 2nd  Team pursuit, 2016–17 UCI Track Cycling World Cup, Cali
2018
 2nd  Team pursuit, UEC European Track Championships
 Team pursuit, 2018–19 UCI Track Cycling World Cup
2nd  Milton
3rd  Saint-Quentin-en-Yvelines
3rd  London
 3rd  Team pursuit, UCI Track Cycling World Championships
2019
 3rd  Team pursuit, 2019–20 UCI Track Cycling World Cup, Glasgow
2020
 3rd  Individual pursuit, UEC European Track Championships

See also
2014 Astana BePink Womens Team season

References

External links
 

1982 births
Living people
Italian female cyclists
Italian track cyclists
Cyclists from the Province of Lecco
Olympic cyclists of Italy
Cyclists at the 2016 Summer Olympics
21st-century Italian women